The Fitzroy Stars Football Club is an Australian rules football club located 7 km north east of central Melbourne in the suburb of Thornbury. The club is based in the Aboriginal community of Melbourne's inner northern suburbs. They usually play their home games at Victoria Park in Abbotsford, the former home ground of the Collingwood Football Club, but have also played at other venues including the Bill Lawry Oval in 2012.

History
The Fitzroy Stars Football Club was formed in 1970 and moved between different football leagues throughout Melbourne. These included the Metropolitan Football League, the Northern Metropolitan Football League, the YCW National Football Association and the Melbourne North Football League of which FSFC was a foundation member in 1988. The FSFC activity was only interrupted by the collapse of these leagues. The club achieved a deal of success during this period as the club played finals on a consistent basis as well as winning premierships in 1977, 1986, 1989, 1990 and 1992. The club disbanded in 1997 and was reformed in the Northern Football League in 2008. In 2008 the Darebin City Council assisted the FSFC to negotiate Crispe Park, Bill Lawry Oval and Preston City Oval for home games in that season.  The FSFC also used Preston RSL Youth Club's Ruthven Reserve as a training venue. In 2009 the club was given the go-ahead to use Victoria Park as its home venue. The club now trains at the Aborigines Advancement League in Watt Street Thornbury.

Current status
The club fields senior and reserve teams in Division Two. The teams currently play their home games at Sir Douglas Nicholls Oval in Thornbury.

In 2008, Lionel "Jacko" Proctor won the Division Two League Best and Fairest. He achieved this goal once again by winning the League Best and Fairest for the 2012 season. The club has achieved a steady rise in success that most recently sees both teams qualifying for finals spots.

References

External links
 Fitzroy Stars Football Club Website
 Northern Football League Website

Northern Football League (Australia) clubs
Australian rules football clubs established in 1970
1970 establishments in Australia
Fitzroy, Victoria
Sport in the City of Darebin
Sport in the City of Yarra
Australian rules football clubs in Melbourne
Organisations serving Indigenous Australians